Tomonobu Hiroi (廣井 友信 Hiroi Tomobu, born 11 January 1985 in Hino, Tokyo) is a Japanese football player currently playing for J2 League team Zweigen Kanazawa.

Career
He graduated from Komazawa University in 2006, Hiori signed full professional terms with S-Pulse the following year, but is yet to break into the first team on a regular basis.

Club career stats
Updated to end of 2018 season.

References

External links

Profile at Zweigen Kanazawa

1985 births
Living people
Komazawa University alumni
Association football people from Tokyo Metropolis
Japanese footballers
J1 League players
J2 League players
Shimizu S-Pulse players
Tokyo Verdy players
Roasso Kumamoto players
Zweigen Kanazawa players
Association football defenders
People from Hino, Tokyo